The Identified Summer Tour was the debut solo concert tour – after High School Musical: The Concert – by American singer and actress Vanessa Hudgens. Marked as the singer's debut headlining tour, it supported her second studio album, Identified as well as performing songs from her debut record V. The tour primarily reached the United States, Mexico and Canada.

Background
Vanessa Hudgens's tour playing at venues in the United States and Canada to promote her debut albums V and Identified. The tour became a major success with critics and spectators alike, selling out every show within the United States. She had Corbin Bleu, Jordan Pruitt and Mandy Moore as opening acts on the tour.

Opening act
Jordan Pruitt (August 8)
Drew Seeley (August 15 and August 27)
Disney Under the Stars (August 23)
Mandy Moore (September 9–13)

Set list
 "Sneakernight"
 "Let Go"
 "Never Underestimate a Girl"
 "Identified"
 "Say OK"
 "Amazed"
 "First Bad Habit"
 "Don't Ask Why"
 "Let's Dance"
 "Hook It Up"
 "Last Night"
 "Gotta Go My Own Way"
 "Come Back to Me"

Tour dates

Festivals and other miscellaneous performances

First Financial Bank’s Friday Night Concert Series
Blue Bayou and Dixie Landin' Summer Concert Series
Wisconsin State Fair
Sunday Rocks!
Jackson County Fair
State Fair of West Virginia
Children's Day
Iowa State Fair
Kentucky State Fair
Illinois State Fair
Crawford County Fair
Six Flags Summer Concert Series
California State Fair
Oregon State Fair
Fair at the PNE
Great New York State Fair
Canfield Fair
On the Waterfront Festival
Utah State Fair
New Mexico State Fair

Cancellations and rescheduled shows

References

External links

2008 concert tours
Vanessa Hudgens concert tours